Steinkraus is a surname. Notable people with the surname include:

Keith H. Steinkraus (1918–2007), American food scientist
Lawrence W. Steinkraus (1922–1992), United States Air Force general
William Steinkraus (1925–2017), American equestrian